Lív Sveinbjørnsdóttir Poulsen (born 27 December 2001) is a Faroese handballer who plays for Ajax København in the Danish Women's Handball League and the Faroe Islands women's national team.

She made her debut on the senior team of Herning-Ikast Håndbold, on 30 January 2019. On 20 March 2021, it was announced that Poulsen had signed a 1-year contract with Ajax København.

She made her debut on the Faroese national team on 29 September 2019, against Poland.

Achievements
Danish Championship:
Runners-up: 2019,
Bronze: 2021
Danish Cup:
Winner: 2019

References

2001 births
Living people
People from Vestmanna Municipality
Faroese female handball players
Expatriate handball players